Enlighten Thy Daughter is a 1934 American drama film directed by John Varley and starring Herbert Rawlinson, Charles Eaton and Claire Whitney. It was shot at the Photocolor Studios in Hastings-on-Hudson, New York. It is a remake of the 1917 silent film of the same title by Ivan Abramson.

Cast
 Herbert Rawlinson as 	Dr. Richard Stevens
 Beth Barton as Ruth Stevens
 Charles Eaton as 	David Stevens
 Claire Whitney as Alice Stevens
 Edmund MacDonald as 	Gerald Winthrop
 Russell Hicks as 	Daniel Stevens
 Ara Gerald as 	Ethel Stevens
 Miriam Battista as Lillian Stevens
 Vinton Hayworth as Stanley Jordan 
 Eunice Reed as Margie
 Wesley Barry as 	Wes
 Audrey Maple as Mrs. Crosby
 Lillian Walker as 	Mrs. Grainger
 Robert Emmett Keane as Dr. Palmer
 Ruth Denning as Singer
 Robert Lively as Singer 
 Paul Vincent as 	Orchestra Leader

References

Bibliography
 Koszarski, Richard. Hollywood on the Hudson: Film and Television in New York from Griffith to Sarnoff. Rutgers University Press, 2008.
 Soister, John T., Nicolella, Henry & Joyce, Steve . American Silent Horror, Science Fiction and Fantasy Feature Films, 1913-1929. McFarland, 2014.

External links
 

1934 films
1934 drama films
American drama films
American black-and-white films
Remakes of American films
Majestic Pictures films
Films set in New York City
Films shot in New York City
1930s English-language films
1930s American films